Serhiy Volodymyrovych Perkhun (4 September 1977 – 28 August 2001) was a Ukrainian footballer. He is the only player to date in the history of the Russian Premier League to die from injuries sustained during an official game.

Career
In 1993–1998, he played for FC Dnipro Dnipropetrovsk. In 1999–2000, he was a first choice goalkeeper for Sheriff Tiraspol. In 2001, he was a first choice goalkeeper for CSKA Moscow.

Serhiy was also capped by the Ukraine national football team in a friendly game against Latvia on 15 August 2001, just 3 days before the accident that led to his death on the 28th. He played in the second half of the match.

He is the youngest player, as of August 2020, in the history of the top league of the Ukrainian football, making his debut at the age of 16 years and 34 days in the game for FC Dnipro Dnipropetrovsk against FC Kryvbas Kryvyi Rih on 8 October 1993 in the Ukrainian Premier League (then Vyshcha Liha).

Death
On 19 August 2001, during the game against Anzhi Makhachkala, Perkhun collided with Budun Budunov. Perkhun died nine days later from a brain hemorrhage, whilst Budunov sustained several head injuries. CSKA Moscow has retired number 16 to honor Perkhun's legacy.

Honours
 1998–99 Moldovan Cup (Sheriff Tiraspol)
 1994 UEFA European Under-16 Championship (third runner)

References

External links
 

1977 births
2001 deaths
Footballers from Dnipro
Ukrainian footballers
Ukraine international footballers
Ukraine under-21 international footballers
Ukraine youth international footballers
Ukrainian expatriate footballers
Expatriate footballers in Moldova
Expatriate footballers in Russia
Association football goalkeepers
FC Dnipro players
FC Dnipro-2 Dnipropetrovsk players
FC Metalurh Novomoskovsk players
FC Sheriff Tiraspol players
PFC CSKA Moscow players
Sport deaths in Russia
Association football players who died while playing
Ukrainian Premier League players
Russian Premier League players
Ukrainian expatriate sportspeople in Moldova
Ukrainian expatriate sportspeople in Russia